Rocket (Kannada: ರಾಕೆಟ್) is a 2015 Kannada romantic comedy film written and directed by Shiva Shashi, produced by and co-starring Sathish Ninasam, alongside Aishani Shetty in the lead roles. Achyuth Kumar, Sundar Raj, Padmaja Rao, Ninasam Ashwath and Rajshri Ponnappa feature in supporting roles.

Plot

The movie is a romantic comedy. The main lead of the movie, Rakesh (Sathish Ninasam), falls in love with Shwetha (Aishani Shetty), and goes through a romantic journey. He faces a lot of hurdles in the journey and overcomes those hurdles forms the crux of the story.

Cast
 Sathish Ninasam as Rakesh
 Aishani Shetty as Shweta
 Rajshri Ponnappa
 Achyuth Kumar
 Sundar Raj
 Nagendra Sha
 Padmaja Rao
 Ninasam Ashwath
 Ashwini Gowda
 Mahanthesh Ramadurga
 Vinay Gowda

Production
The shooting of the movie commenced in December 2014 and finished in July 2015. The movie has been shot in Bangalore and some locations of Coorg.

Soundtrack
The music of the movie has been composed by Poornachandra Tejaswi of Lucia fame. The movie has five songs, one of the which has been sung by Kannada film actor Puneeth Rajkumar. Apart from known voices it also has voices from a pool of new Kannada singers.

References

External links 

 

2015 films
2010s Kannada-language films
Indian romantic comedy films
2015 romantic comedy films